The Natural Resources Research Institute (NRRI) is a United States (U.S.) based research institute founded by the Minnesota state legislature within the University of Minnesota Duluth. NRRI is a non-profit, applied research organization, established with a mission to improve the economy of Minnesota. 

The Institute aims to help launch small businesses and provides ongoing research and development assistance.

History
The mid- to late-1970s and early-1980s were particularly difficult times for Minnesota's natural resource-based industries, especially for the taconite mining industry.  In the face of a domestic steel crisis, shipments of iron ore from Northeastern Minnesota's eight taconite plants plummeted. Growth in the taconite industry, which had begun in the 1950s, ended and employment in this critical base industry dropped from about 16,000 to 3,000. About 2,000 supply companies on the Iron Range, in Duluth and elsewhere in the state were also critically impacted.

Perhaps not as dramatically as the taconite industry, the forest products industry was similarly impacted by the difficult economy. Northeastern Minnesota's logging and pulp and paper companies, in particular, were affected. At that time, the overall impact on Duluth and the Iron Range economy was verging on catastrophic.

In the face of these challenging times, civic, business, government, higher education and labor leaders began to focus on initiatives to help the economy. With a strong belief in its long-term value, U.S. Eighth District Court of Appeals Judge Gerald Heaney advocated for applied research. Then, in his 1982 gubernatorial campaign, Rudy Perpich proposed that a center be established to do research on such resources as peat, biomass, forest products, water and minerals.

A proposal to establish a Natural Resources Research Institute at the University of Minnesota Duluth was submitted to the Minnesota State Legislature under the seal of the Regents of the University of Minnesota. The proposal affirmed the applied nature of research at the new institute, noting that its work would be separate and distinct from the University’s Minerals Resources Research Center, and recommended the SAGE building in Duluth as an adaptable site.  UMD Chancellor Robert Heller worked with Governor Perpich and Judge Heaney to gain political support throughout the state. The Institute also had strong federal support which included that of Minnesota's 8th district congressman, Jim Oberstar.

The proposal called for the institute to be divided into four major divisions: 
 Minerals
 Biomass
 Water
 Energy
The Regents proposal listed the members of the Minerals Development Commission, the Duluth High Tech Task Force and Duluth Future Task Force as endorsees of the Institute.

The simple notation of first-year funding of $1,650,000 and second-year funding of $2,250,000 for the Natural Resources Research Institute in Chapter 258, page 1051 of the LAWS of MINNESOTA for 1983, marks the establishment of the Institute.

Starting to operate

UMD Economics Professor Dr. Jerrold Peterson was named acting coordinator of the Institute and he began to hire temporary employees to begin the work of the Institute. An Advisory Board was established, with UMD Dean of the College of Science and Engineering George (Rip) Rapp as chair.

In August 1983, UMD Provost Robert Heller envisioned NRRI doing between $5 and $10 million per year in research and employing up to 150 staff members in five years.

Dr. Michael Lalich, with a background in industrial research and development, was the first permanent director of the Institute, starting on the job in April of 1984. He soon began the task of conducting national searches for Associate Directors for each of the four divisions.  Successful candidates included:  Dr. Thys Johnson, a native of Duluth and Department Head of Mining at the Colorado School of Mines; Dr. Robert Naiman, a scientist at the Woods Hole Oceanographic Institute and Director of a Research Station in Quebec; Dr. Eugene Shull, Associate Director of the Pennsylvania State University Combustion Laboratory; and Dr. Roy Adams, a senior research scientist at the Michigan Technological University Institute of Wood Research. John Sandy, head of the P-M-A Library at the University of Texas at Austin, was hired in November 1984 to develop a research library for the Institute.

Because of Minnesota's economic dependence on its natural resources, NRRI adopted the mission to foster the economic development of Minnesota’s natural resources in an environmentally sensitive manner to promote private sector employment.

The institute's goals are:
 Assisting entrepreneurs and businesses with near-term economic development.
 Conducting applied research to develop products, processes, and services that will be of future benefit to Minnesota's industries and resource managers.
 Improving the knowledge base of Minnesota's natural resources to assist resource managers to make sound economic and environmental decisions.

While the NRRI is not a teaching institution, it fulfills its academic goals with research conducted by faculty and students at the Institute and several NRRI employees hold faculty or adjunct faculty positions. NRRI assists students by providing scholarships and research assistantships. Moreover, the applied research skills learned at NRRI are invaluable in securing employment after graduation. University faculty and students interact with NRRI researchers to conduct collaborative research on a wide range of topics.

Institute evolution
Many of the early research directions for the Institute proved to be very productive and defined NRRI’s ongoing research agenda.  For example, applied research to assist the taconite industry with more efficient processing and to improve pellet quality has been a mainstay of the NRRI’s minerals research since its inception. Likewise, helping the forest products industry develop value-added products and improve silvicultural practices have been primary objectives. A resurgent interest in renewable energy production has refocused research on biomass as a source of energy. An early focus on ecological research to understand the role of humans and natural disturbances in regulating aquatic and terrestrial ecosystems also continued through the decades.

In 1989, the Institute was reorganized from the four original divisions to its current structure based on three research centers:

The Center for Water and the Environment with biologists, ecologists and limnologists to study development impacts and provide tools and data for informed decision-making by environment managers.

The Center for Applied Research and Technology Development includes elements of the original minerals and biomass divisions.

The UMD Center for Economic Development is a joint program of NRRI, the School of Business and Economics, and the College of Science and Engineering.

NRRI expansion
In 1986, NRRI began a long-term relationship with United States Steel Corporation to manage its Coleraine, Minnesota, laboratory.  The laboratory was transferred to University ownership in 1989. As part of NRRI's CARTD, the minerals lab has a three-pronged strategy for improving taconite ore products from the Iron Range: flowsheet improvement, the use of by-product rock for construction and highway purposes, and the development of value-added iron nodules from the iron ore concentrate. Serving all Minnesota taconite plants, the research projects regularly reach the stage of commercial implementation after testing and demonstration in the lab's large pilot plants. The lab is currently developing a focus on the extraction of non-ferrous minerals from Northeast Minnesota's Duluth Complex of copper, nickel, and precious metals-bearing ore. The Biomass Conversion Lab at Coleraine has an industrial-scale kiln to convert woody and agricultural biomass into a variety of chars for a variety of applications.

NRRI received a National Science Foundation  grant in 1990 to establish a geographic information system (GIS) laboratory within the Center for Water and the Environment.  The visualization and spatial modeling techniques, along with state-of-the-art procedures developed in the GIS lab, give NRRI an advantage in the very competitive environment of procuring federally sponsored research grants and contracts. The Center's scientists are recognized around the world for their expertise in landscape ecology and the application of GIS technology for addressing natural resource questions.

A field station was established in Ely, Minnesota, in 1999 to study microscopic algae (diatoms) as indicators of water quality and for paleolimnology research to understand environmental trends through analysis of sediment profiles. This site was closed in 2006 and incorporated into NRRI Duluth.

NRRI acquired  of drained peatland in Zim, Minnesota, in 1986. The Fens Research Site serves as an area for peatland restoration research and provides wetland mitigation credits for area road construction projects.

The institute today

After the retirement of long-time Director Michael Lalich in 2015, NRRI welcomed new Executive Director Rolf Weberg. Under his leadership, NRRI reorganized into five Research Platforms that work together to inform integrated, applied research. The Research Platforms are: Applied Ecology and Resource Management, Minerals & Metallurgy, Materials & Bioeconomy, Data Collection and Delivery, and Commercialization Services.

Partial listing of current research activity
 Direct reduction technologies for pure iron nodules
 Use of taconite tailings as road aggregate and road patch
 Development of sampling methods for hard-bottom habitats in the Great Lakes
 Deployable emergency relief housing
 Hybrid poplars for the pulp and paper industry and biomass conversion
 Biomass and torrefaction for alternative energy
 Predicting effects of climate and land-use change on cold-water fish habitat in lakes
 Predicting effects of climate change on Minnesota's water resources
 Monitoring songbirds for increasing and decreasing species to inform forest management
 Research on threatened wildlife species in Minnesota
 Finding markets for recyclable materials deconstructed buildings
 Stream restoration and stormwater runoff reduction
 Lean manufacturing techniques for wood products industry
 Materials testing to help growing businesses
 Materials development from renewable waste resources

References

External links
 Natural Resources Research Institute
 Natural Resources Library (merged with UMD Kathryn A. Martin Library)
 A Proposal to Establish a Natural Resources Research Institute at the University of Minnesota Duluth
 Introducing...The Natural Resources Research Institute (in 1985) 

Research institutes in Minnesota
University of Minnesota Duluth